The 1897 Columbian Orange and Blue football team was an American football team that represented Columbian University (now known as George Washington University) as an independent during the 1897 college football season. In their second season under head coach Graham Nichols, the team compiled a 4–5–1 record.

Schedule

References

Columbian
George Washington Colonials football seasons
Columbian University football